Komodo is a district (Indonesian: kecamatan) in the regency (Indonesian: kabupaten) of West Manggarai, East Nusa Tenggara, Indonesia.

Villages
 Labuan Bajo
 Kelurahan Wae Kelambu
 Desa Komodo
 Desa Papa Garang
 Desa Pasir Panjang
 Desa Golo Mori
 Desa Warloka
 Desa Tiwu Nampar
 Desa Golo Pongkor
 Desa Macang Tanggar
 Desa Pasir Putih
 Desa Goron Talo
 Desa Golo Bilas
 Desa Nggorang
 Desa Watu Nggelek
 Desa Batu Cermin
 Desa Pantar
 Desa Seraya Maranu
 Desa Compang Longgo

References
  Situs Kabupaten Manggarai Barat
Land area reference: https://manggaraibaratkab.bps.go.id/publication/2017/09/20/8f9cc9fda1662b6f26cdedd2/kecamatan-komodo-dalam-angka-2017.html

Districts of East Nusa Tenggara
Populated places in East Nusa Tenggara
East Nusa Tenggara